The PL-15 (NATO reporting name: CH-AA-10 Abaddon) is an active radar-guided long-range air-to-air missile developed by the People's Republic of China.

History
The PL-15 is developed by Luoyang-based CAMA. The missile was test fired in 2011 and referenced by Chinese state media in 2015. It was spotted in 2013 mounted on a prototype of Chengdu J-20.

The PL-15 entered People's Liberation Army Air Force (PLAAF) military service around 2015 to 2017. The carrying platforms include the Chengdu J-10C, the Shenyang J-16 and the Chengdu J-20. It has also been spotted on the Shenyang J-11B. The PL-15 has begun to replace the earlier PL-12 as the standard beyond-visual-range missile for both PLAAF and People's Liberation Army Naval Air Force (PLANAF) fighters.

In 2017, the United States began developing the AIM-260 Joint Advanced Tactical Missile (JATM) to replace the currently in-service AIM-120 Advanced Medium-Range Air-to-Air Missile (AMRAAM) in order to better counter the PL-15. The AIM-260 JATM is planned to enter service in late 2022, with advanced variants of the AIM-120 AMRAAM serving as a stop-gap until the 260 can be fielded.

Design
The cropped control fins are designed for internal carriage by stealth aircraft. It incorporates a dual-pulsed solid-fuel rocket motor, capable of a speed of Mach 4+ and a range of more than  – comparable to that of the Anglo-French MBDA Meteor missile. Compared to ramjet-powered Meteor, which advantages in sustained flight profile with a fly-out speed between Mach 3 and 3.5, the dual-pulsed solid propellant rocket motor of PL-15 potentially offers higher burn-out speed excess of Mach 5, then gradually loses its velocity at the terminal phase.

The missile is guided by a miniature active electronically scanned array radar seeker, sporting both active and passive modes for the different mission set. It also features improved resistance to countermeasures. The hybrid guidance system supports a mid-course two-way datalink led by AEW&C aircraft and autonomous terminal radar homing.

The export version has less range than the domestic version, possibly due to changes in propellant or rocket motor. This is similar to the situation between SD-10 and its domestic counterpart PL-12.

Variants
PL-15E Export version of PL-15.

Operators
 
 People's Liberation Army Air Force: PL-15
 People's Liberation Army Naval Air Force: PL-15
 
 Pakistan Air Force: PL-15E

See also
PL-17
PL-21

Comparable Missiles
Meteor (missile)
AIM-260 JATM

References

Bibliography

Air-to-air missiles of the People's Republic of China
Military equipment introduced in the 2010s
Weapons of the People's Republic of China